| top point scorer = 
| top try scorer = 
| website    = www.premiershiprugby.com
| prevseason = 2016–17
| nextseason = 2018–19
}}

The 2017–18 Premiership Rugby A League is the 15th season of the A League of the English domestic Premiership Rugby competition and the eighth to be sponsored by Aviva.

The reigning champions entering the season were Northampton Wanderers, who claimed their second title after defeating Gloucester United 36 - 15 in the 2016–17 final.

London Irish A return to the league after a year's hiatus last season due to the first team's relegation from the Premiership, Bristol United remain in the league despite their first team being relegated last year.

Teams
North Pool:

Leicester Tigers A
Newcastle Falcons A
Northampton Wanderers
Sale Jets
Wasps A
Worcester Cavaliers

South Pool:

Bath United
Bristol United
Exeter Braves
Gloucester United
Harlequins A
London Irish A
Saracens Storm

Table

Regular season
Fixtures for the season were announced by Premiership Rugby on 14 July 2017.

All fixtures are subject to change.

Northern Conference Round 1

Northern Conference Round 2

References

A League